The Richmond Rebels were one of eight teams in the United States Baseball League, and were based in Richmond, Virginia. The league  collapsed within two months of its creation from May 1 to June 24, 1912. The Rebels were  managed by Alfred Newman and owned by Ernest Landgraf.

1912 standings 

In the United States Baseball League's only season, the Rebels finished 2nd in the league with a 15-11 record. The league had originally planned to have a 126-game season, but failed to have any team play 27 games.

On the USBL's opening day on May 1, more than 9,000 fans saw the Rebels defeat the Washington Senators 2-0. The umpire was Arlie Latham.

Notable players
 Socks Seybold

References

 
Defunct sports teams in Virginia
Defunct baseball teams in Virginia